Robin Anderson and Jessika Ponchet were the defending champions when the event was held as an ITF W60 event in 2019, but Ponchet was unable to participate due to insufficient ranking. Anderson played alongside Erin Routliffe but lost in the first round to Kaitlyn Christian and Giuliana Olmos.

Hayley Carter and Luisa Stefani won the title, defeating Marie Bouzková and Jil Teichmann in the final, 6–1, 7–5.

Seeds

Draw

Draw

References 

 Main draw

Top Seed Open Doubles